KRI Teluk Semangka (512) is the lead ship of the  of the Indonesian Navy.

Design 

She was powered by two diesel engines, with total sustained power output of  distributed in two shaft.

Teluk Semangka has a capacity of 200 troops,  of cargo (which includes 17 main battle tanks), and 4 LCVPs on davits. The ship has a complement of 90 personnel, including 13 officers.

She were armed with three single Bofors 40 mm L/70 guns, two single Rheinmettal 20 mm autocannons, and two single DShK 12.7 mm heavy machine guns.

The ship has helicopter decks in the amidships and aft for small to medium helicopter such as Westland Wasp or MBB Bo 105.

Construction and commissioning 
KRI Teluk Semangka was built by Korea Tacoma Shipyard in Masan, ordered in June 1979. She was commissioned on 20 January 1981.

She was decommissioned on 24 April 2013 and later on 1 May, two Indonesian Navy warships registered as state property by the Ministry of Defense have been approved for destruction. The Directorate General of State Assets of the Ministry of Finance has approved the destruction of KRI Teluk Semangka and KRI Teluk Berau. The two ships were sunk as targets in a joint Indonesian Navy exercise.

References

Bibliography
 

Ships built by Hanjin Heavy Industries
Amphibious warfare vessels of the Indonesian Navy
Teluk Semangka-class tank landing ships
1980 ships
Ships sunk as targets